Kevin Robert Trabalka (born 28 November 1996) is a Romanian footballer who plays as a striker for Unirea Sântana.

Honours
Șoimii Lipova
Liga III: 2020–21

References

External links
 

1996 births
Living people
Romanian footballers
FC UTA Arad players
FC Dinamo București players
FC Bihor Oradea players
FC U Craiova 1948 players
Liga I players
Liga II players
Association football forwards
Sportspeople from Arad, Romania